The Chilliwack Batholith is a large batholith that forms much of the North Cascades in southwestern British Columbia, Canada and the U.S. state of Washington.

The geological structure is named after the Chilliwack River Valley, where it outcrops in many places. It does not outcrop anywhere near the City of Chilliwack.

The Chilliwack Batholith is part of the Pemberton Volcanic Belt and is the largest mass of exposed intrusive rock in the Cascade Volcanic Arc.

The age of the Chilliwack batholith ranges from 26 to 29 million years old.

References

Pemberton Volcanic Belt
Igneous petrology of Washington (state)
Batholiths of North America
Igneous petrology of British Columbia
Paleogene magmatism